Levon Aghasyan (Armenian: Լեւոն Աղասյան; born 19 January 1995) is an Armenian athlete specialising in the triple jump. He represented his country at the 2016 Summer Olympics and the 2020 Summer Olympics without qualifying for the final. In addition, he won the gold medal at the 2013 European Junior Championships.

His personal bests in the event are 16.85 metres outdoors (+0.9 m/s, Artashat 2016) and 16.59 metres indoors (Ust-Kamenogorsk 2017).

International competitions

References

1995 births
Living people
Armenian male triple jumpers
Athletes (track and field) at the 2016 Summer Olympics
Athletes (track and field) at the 2020 Summer Olympics
Olympic athletes of Armenia
Olympic male triple jumpers
People from Kapan
Competitors at the 2019 Summer Universiade